Pontiac is a historic village in Warwick, Rhode Island, and part of the .

History
Native Americans referred to the area as "Papepieset" or "Toskiounke."  After arriving in 1642, the early English settlers called the area "Great Weir" because fishing weirs were used to catch fish near the falls. After a bridge was constructed in the locality, the area became known as "the great bridge near the weir," and eventually " Capt. Benjamin Greene's bridge" then "Arnold's bridge." After Senator John Hopkins Clarke purchased the water rights, the region assumed the name of "Clarksville."  After purchasing the area, the Pontiac Manufacturing Company named the area "Pontiac" after Chief Pontiac a Northwestern Indian chief. Allegedly, "Mr. Clark, while out in Michigan, saw the picture of the old chief, Pontiac, and on his return had it engraved, to be used as a label on his goods. The name gradually became attached to the village after he left, though many continued to call it " Arnold's Bridge."  In 1863 Benjamin Knight and Robert Knight, two brothers, built the Pontiac Mills in the village.

See also 
 List of Registered Historic Places in Rhode Island
New York, Providence and Boston Railroad, operated the Pontiac Branch Railroad to the village
Pontiac Mills

References

External links
The history of Warwick, Rhode Island, from its settlement in 1642 to the present time: including accounts of the early settlement and development of its several villages; sketches of the origin and progress of the different churches of the town, &c., &c by Oliver Payson Fuller (Angell, Burlingame & co., printers, 1875)pg. 259 

Villages in Kent County, Rhode Island
Cranston, Rhode Island
Warwick, Rhode Island
Villages in Rhode Island